Hina Javed is a Pakistani actress. She is known for her roles in dramas Jia Na Jaye, Zid, Alif Allah Aur Insaan, Sila, Pardes and Meray Paas Tum Ho.

Early life
She was born in 1985 on 25 August in Jeddah, Saudi Arabia to Pakistani parents and Hina's parents were from Hyderabad Deccan region of South India. She completed her school and college from the Pakistan International School in Jeddah. Later her parents moved to Karachi and she studied at University of Karachi.

Career
She made her debut as an actress on ARY Digital sitcom Timmy G series. She was noted for her roles in dramas Timmy G Season 2, Jia Na Jaye, Zid and Sila. Hina also appeared in dramas Kahi Unkahi, Mohabbat Khawab Safar and Shanakht. Since then she appeared in dramas Pardes, Aulaad, Wafa Be Mol and Meray Paas Tum Ho. Hina's role as Farwah in drama Aulaad was well received by audience and Hina's role as Wateera in Meray Paas Tum Ho was meet with positive reviews.

Personal life
Hina's younger sisters Sana Javed and Tahmina Javed are both actresses. Hina's brother Abdullah Javed is a model and her sister Sana is married to singer Umair Jaswal.

Filmography

Television

Telefilm

References

External links
 

1985 births
Living people
Pakistani television actresses
21st-century Pakistani actresses